Williamsville is an unincorporated community in Sussex County, Delaware, United States. Williamsville is located on Delaware Route 54 between Selbyville and Fenwick Island.

It was the site of the Williamsville Colored School.

References

Unincorporated communities in Sussex County, Delaware
Unincorporated communities in Delaware